Kolokoltsevo is a rural locality (a village) in Krasnoselskoye Rural Settlement, Yuryev-Polsky District, Vladimir Oblast, Russia. The population was 6 as of 2010.

Geography 
Kolokoltsevo is located on the Koloksha River, 7 km south of Yuryev-Polsky (the district's administrative centre) by road. Sosnovy Bor is the nearest rural locality.

References 

Rural localities in Yuryev-Polsky District